USS Pomodon (SS-486), a Tench-class submarine, was the only ship of the United States Navy to be named for the Pomodon (an obsolete synonym for Hemilutjanus) genera of snapper.

Construction and commissioning
Pomodon′s keel was laid down on 29 January 1945 by the Portsmouth Navy Yard in Kittery, Maine. She was launched on 12 June 1945 sponsored by Mrs. Lorena Neff, and commissioned on 11 September 1945.

Departure
Departing Portsmouth 6 January 1946, Pomodon slipped through the Cape Cod Canal and set her course for the Panama Canal Zone for further training. By May the submarine was back north to New London, Connecticut, for several days operations before an availability and upkeep period at New London.

Slipping out of the Submarine Base at New London, Pomodon set her course southward again; transited the Panama Canal arriving San Diego, California, on 12 October, and joined Submarine Squadron 3. After alterations at Mare Island from 25 October 1946 to 26 July 1947 had made Pomodon the first Greater Underwater Propulsive Power Program (GUPPY) submarine in the Pacific Fleet, the submarine returned to San Diego on 28 July and began operations in the area as part of Task Forces 52 and 56.

Korean hostilities
At the outbreak of hostilities in Korea in July 1950, Pomodon was deployed to Pearl Harbor. In January 1951, Pomodon was again modernized at Mare Island Naval Shipyard and in May 1951 she returned to service as the most modern and advanced GUPPY submarine in the Submarine Force.

Pomodon departed San Diego in November 1951 for a six-month deployment with the United Nations Forces in Korea, followed by operations in the San Diego area. During the next decade, the submarine made six more WestPac deployments.

Explosion
On 21 February 1955, while recharging batteries in the San Francisco Naval Yard, a build-up of hydrogen gas caused an explosion and fire, damaging the submarine and killing five men.  TM1(SS) Charles E. Payne earned the Navy Commendation Ribbon with Metal Pendant (later renamed as the Navy Commendation Medal) by his actions in fighting the fire and rescuing the injured. Pasquale Talladino EnD2(SS) received the Navy and Marine Corps Medal. After the third explosion he entered the control room through the conning tower in an attempt to rescue anyone who might still be alive.

Final deployments
On 16 November 1962, Pomodon sank the hulk of ex-Aspro (SS-309).
Pomodon’s eighth deployment with the Seventh Fleet, 6 June to 30 November 1966, took her to Vietnamese waters and she operated with American destroyers and antisubmarine aircraft carrier  on Yankee Station. Training operations on the West Coast and overhaul at the San Francisco Naval Shipyard, filled 1967. She again headed west across the Pacific for her ninth deployment on 22 March 1968. She operated in Japanese waters, off Okinawa, and in the Philippines before entering the Vietnam combat zone 13 August. Pomodon returned to San Diego 17 October 1968.

Disposal
Stricken from the Naval Vessel Register on 1 August 1970, Pomodon was sold on 28 December 1971.

References

External links
 Photo gallery at navsource.org

Tench-class submarines
Cold War submarines of the United States
Korean War submarines of the United States
Vietnam War submarines of the United States
Ships built in Kittery, Maine
1945 ships
Maritime incidents in 1955
United States submarine accidents